Chilabothrus strigilatus, the Bahamian boa, is a species of snake in the family Boidae. The species is found in the Bahamas.

Subspecies
Five subspecies are recognized, including the nominate subspecies:

Chilabothrus strigilatus strigilatus (Bahamian boa) (Cope, 1863) - New Providence Island, including Rose Island, Eleuthera Island, Long Island and the Exuma Cays near Andros Island, the Bahamas
Chilabothrus strigilatus ailurus (Cat Island boa) Sheplan & Schwartz, 1974 - Cat Island and Alligator Cay, the Bahamas 
Chliabothrus strigilatus fosteri (Bimini boa) Barbour, 1941 - Bimini Island, the Bahamas
Chilabothrus strigilatus fowleri (Andros boa) Sheplan & Schwartz, 1974 - Andros Island and Berry Island, the Bahamas
Chilabothrus strigilatus mcraniei (Ragged Island boa) Sheplan & Schwartz, 1974 - Ragged Island, the Bahamas

References 

Chilabothrus
Reptiles described in 1862
Taxa named by Edward Drinker Cope